Shark Monroe is a 1918 American silent adventure film directed by William S. Hart and written by C. Gardner Sullivan. The film stars William S. Hart, Katherine MacDonald, Joseph Singleton, George A. McDaniel, and Bert Sprotte. The film was released on June 30, 1918, by Paramount Pictures.

Plot
As described in a film magazine, Shark Monroe (Hart), owner of a sealing vessel, agrees to take Marjorie Hilton (MacDonald) and her brother Webster (McDaniel) to Skagway, provided Webster works his own passage. Majorie falls into the power of Big Baxter (Singleton), a notorious character of the Alaskan coast, and agrees to marry him. Shark appears and, while his men hold the wedding party at bay, marries and runs off with Marjorie. At the end of two weeks he agrees to safely return her to Baxter's camp. Webster and Baxter arrive, however, and to restore the young man confidence Shark allows Webster to beat him in a fist fight. Later, after overhearing Baxter lie about him, Shark kills Baxter with one blow, and Marjorie has her eyes opened as to the bigness of the man.

Cast
William S. Hart as Shark Monroe	
Katherine MacDonald as Marjorie Hilton
Joseph Singleton as Big Baxter
George A. McDaniel as Webster Hilton
Bert Sprotte as Onion McNab

Reception
Like many American films of the time, Shark Monroe was subject to restrictions and cuts by city and state film censorship boards. For example, the Chicago Board of Censors cut, in Reel 2, the intertitle "Prospering through the degradation of women" and, in Reel 5, the intertitle "He's dead".

Preservation status
A copy of the film is preserved in the Museum of Modern Art, New York.

References

External links 
 

1918 films
American adventure films
1918 adventure films
Paramount Pictures films
Films directed by William S. Hart
American black-and-white films
American silent feature films
1910s English-language films
1910s American films
Silent adventure films